Broadcasters for the Los Angeles Clippers, San Diego Clippers, and Buffalo Braves National Basketball Association teams.

Television

Play-by-play
Chuck Healy: 1972–1973 (WBEN-TV) 
Van Miller: 1973–1978 (WBEN-TV)
Ted Leitner: 1978–1984
Al Albert: 1984–1985 (KTTV) 
Phil Stone: 1985–1986 (KTLA)
Dave Diles: 1986–1987 (KTLA) 
Ralph Lawler: 1987–2019 (KTLA, KCOP-TV, KCAL-TV, Z Channel, & Fox Sports Net Prime Ticket)
Tom Kelly: 1990–1991 (Prime Ticket) 
Joel Meyers: 1991–1993 (SportsChannel Los Angeles)
Brian Sieman: 2019–present

Color analysts
Rudy Martzke: 1972–1974 (WBEN-TV) 
Dick Rifenburg: 1977–1978 (WBEN-TV)
Stu Lantz: 1978–1983
John Olive: 1983–1984
Ted Green: 1984–1985 (KTTV) 
Tommy Hawkins: 1985–1986 (KTLA)
Norm Nixon: 1986–1987 (KTLA) 
Junior Bridgeman: 1987–1988 (KTLA) 
Keith Erickson: 1988–1990 (Z Channel) 
Kevin Loughery: 1988–1990 (KTLA) 
Mike Fratello: 1990–1992 (KTLA, KCOP-TV) 
Earl Strom: 1990–1991 (Prime Ticket)
Jerry Tarkanian: 1991–1992 (SportsChannel Los Angeles) 
Bill Walton: 1992–2002 (SportsChannel Los Angeles, KCOP-TV, KCAL-TV, Fox Sports Net Prime Ticket)
Mike Smith: 2002–2017 (KTLA, Fox Sports Net Prime Ticket)
Bruce Bowen: 2017–2018 (Fox Sports Net Prime Ticket)
Don MacLean: 2018-2019 (Fox Sports Net Prime Ticket)
Chauncey Billups: 2019–2020 (Fox Sports Net Prime Ticket)
Jim Jackson: 2020–present (Fox Sports Net Prime Ticket, Bally Sports SoCal and Bally Sports West)
When Walton worked for the NBA on NBC, Keith Erickson, Hubie Brown, Rick Barry, Reggie Theus, and Mike Smith served as alternate announcers.

When Fratello worked on NBC, Bob Weiss served as alternate announcer.

Broadcast outlets

Terrestrial television
Buffalo
WBEN-TV: 1972–1978

San Diego
KFMB-TV: 1978–1980; 1983–1984
XETV: 1980–1982
KCST-TV: 1982–1983

Los Angeles
KTTV: 1984–1985
KTLA: 1985–1991; 2002–2009; 2022-
KCOP-TV: 1991–1996; 2011; 2012, 2017-
KCAL-TV: 1996–2001

Cable television
Z Channel: 1988–1989
SportsChannel Los Angeles: 1989–1990
Prime Ticket:1990-1991
SportsChannel Los Angeles: 1991-1992
Prime Ticket/Fox Sports Net West: 1992–1997
Fox Sports Net Prime Ticket: 1997–2021
Bally Sports SoCal and Bally Sports West: 2021–present

Television network 
Station lineup (as of 2022)

Radio

Play-by-Play
Van Miller: 1970–1978
Ralph Lawler: 1978–1981, 1982–1984, 1985–1987, 1989–1990 (All non-televised games since 1987)
Jerry Gross: 1981–1982
Eddie Doucette: 1984–1985 
Pete Arbogast: 1984–1989
Rich Marotta: 1990–1994
Rory Markas: 1994–1999
Mike Smith: 1999–2002
John Ireland: 1999–2002 (Fill-in)
Mel Proctor: 2002–2005
Matt Pinto: 2005–2007
Brian Sieman: 2007–2018
Noah Eagle: 2019–Present

Color analysts
Rudy Martzke: 1972–1974
Dick Rifenburg: 1977–1978 
Stu Lantz: 1978–1983
John Olive: 1983–1984
Ted Green: 1984–1986 
Norm Nixon: 1986–1987
Kevin Loughery: 1989–1990
Keith Erickson: 1988–1990
Rich Marotta: 1990–1994 (Non-televised games)
Rory Markas: 1994–1999 (Non-televised games)
Mike Smith: 1999–2017 (Non-televised games)
Scott Brooks: 1998–1999
Norm Nixon: 2004–2005
Bruce Bowen: 2017–2018

Flagship Station
Buffalo
WBEN (1970–1978)

San Diego
KFMB (1978–1980; 1983–1984)
KOGO (1980–1982)
KCNN (1982–1983)

Los Angeles 
KFOX (1984)
KLAC (1984–1987, March 19, 2016–present)
KIIS-AM (1987–1988)
KRLA (1988–1992)
KMPC (1992–1995)
KNNS (1995–1997)
KXTA/KTLK (1997–2006)
KSPN (2006–2009)
KTNQ (Spanish; 2004–2009)
KFWB (2009–March 16, 2016)
KWKW (Spanish; 2009–present)
KEIB (2016–present (alternate))

Radio Network
Station Lineup (as of 2016)

References

SportsChannel
Fox Sports Networks
Bally Sports
Los Angeles Clippers
Broadcasters